Collagen alpha-1(IV) chain (COL4A1) is a protein that in humans is encoded by the COL4A1 gene on chromosome 13. It is ubiquitously expressed in many tissues and cell types. COL4A1 is a subunit of the type IV collagen and plays a role in angiogenesis. Mutations in the gene have been linked to diseases of the brain, muscle, kidney, eye, and cardiovascular system. The COL4A1 gene also contains one of 27 SNPs associated with increased risk of coronary artery disease.

Structure

Gene 
The COL4A1 gene resides on chromosome 13 at the band 13q34 and contains 54 exons.[5] This gene produces 2 isoforms through alternative splicing.

Protein 
COL4A1 belongs to the type IV collagen family and contains three domains: a short N-terminal domain, a long triple-helical 7S domain at its center, and a non-collagenous 1 (NC1) domain at its C-terminal. The triple-helical domain contains interrupted G-X-Y repeats, which is suspected to allow flexibility of the domain. The NC1 domain is composed of  two trimeric caps, each containing two alpha 1 fragments and one alpha 2 fragment, that form a sixfold propeller arranged around an axial tunnel. The interaction between these two caps occurs along a large planar interface and is stabilized by a covalent cross-link between the alpha 1 and alpha 2 chains across the two caps.

Function 

Type IV collagen is the major structural component of basement membranes, which contains two or three COL4A1 proteins. Thus, COL4A1 is abundant and found in all types of basement membranes. The NC1 domain of COL4A1 is an important antiangiogenic molecule to control the formation of new capillaries. NC1 binds to the α1β1 integrin and inhibits specific integrin signaling pathways in vascular epithelial cells. It also regulates HIF-1α and VEGF expression, presumably by inhibiting the MAPK signaling cascade. These findings may explain the antitumorigenic function of NC1.

Clinical significance 

Mutations in COL4A1 exons 24 and 25 are associated with HANAC (autosomal dominant hereditary angiopathy with nephropathy, aneurysms, and muscle cramps). It has also been confirmed that mutations in the COL4A1 gene occur in some patients with porencephaly and schizencephaly.

In humans, a novel mutation of the COL4A1 gene coding for collagen type IV was found to be associated with autosomal dominant congenital cataract in a Chinese family. This mutation was not found in unaffected family members or in 200 unrelated controls. In this study, sequence analysis confirmed that the Gly782 amino acid residue was highly conserved. This report of a new mutation in the COL4A1 gene is the first report of a non-syndromic autosomal dominant congenital cataract that highlights an important role for collagen type IV in the physiological and optical properties of the lens.

Additionally, in the cardiovascular field, the COL4A1 and COL4A2 regions on chromosome 13q34 are a highly replicated locus for coronary artery disease. In a normal wall of arteries, collagen type IV acts to inhibit smooth muscle cell proliferation. Accordingly, it was demonstrated that protein expression of collagen type IV in human vascular smooth muscle cells is regulated by both SMAD3 protein and TGFβ mediated stimulation of mRNA. Altogether, it was concluded that the pathogenesis of coronary artery disease may be regulated by COL4A1 and COL4A2 genes.

An autosomal recessive encephalopathy associated with mutations in this gene has also been reported.

Clinical Marker 
A multi-locus genetic risk score study based on a combination of 27 loci, including the COL4A1 gene, identified individuals at increased risk for both incident and recurrent coronary artery disease events, as well as an enhanced clinical benefit from statin therapy. The study was based on a community cohort study (the Malmo Diet and Cancer study) and four additional randomized controlled trials of primary prevention cohorts (JUPITER and ASCOT) and secondary prevention cohorts (CARE and PROVE IT-TIMI 22).

References

Further reading

External links 
 GeneReviews/NCBI/NIH/UW entry on COL4A1-Related Disorders - Autosomal Dominant Type 1 Porencephaly; Brain Small Vessel Disease with Hemorrhage; Hereditary Angiopathy with Nephropathy, Aneurysms, and Muscle Cramps